Xoy or XOY may refer to:

 The Xoy River, in Acala Ch'ol
 Xoy ceremony, a divination festival in the Fatick Region
 XOY, former name of the Japanese WEBTOON channel